KCBT-LD (channel 34) is a low-powered television station in Bakersfield, California, United States, affiliated with the Spanish-language Estrella TV network. It is owned by Cocola Broadcasting.

History

In the 1990s and early 2000s, KCBT was originally KJBC-LP, a Christian religious station originally on channel 55, then moved to analog channels 33 and 35 in the southern San Joaquin Valley. In the late 2000s, KJBC became a home shopping-based station. As of 2019, the channel combined virtual channels with other Cocola owned station KBFK-LP, Both stations are now located on channel 34.

Subchannels
The station's digital signal is multiplexed:

References

CBT-LD
Low-power television stations in the United States
Television channels and stations established in 1994
Movies! affiliates
Antenna TV affiliates
CBT-CD